Gaptsakh is a rural locality (a selo) in Magaramkentsky District, Republic of Dagestan, Russia. The population was 3,554 as of 2010. There are 23 streets.

Geography 
Gaptsakh is located 6 km northeast of Magaramkent (the district's administrative centre) by road. Yarag-Kazmalyar and Gogaz are the nearest rural localities.

Nationalities 
Lezgins live there.

References 

Rural localities in Magaramkentsky District